Vog or VOG may refer to:
 Vog, air pollution resulting from sulfur dioxide emitted by volcanoes
 Video-oculography, an eye-movement measurement technique
 Voices of Gotham, a choir based in New York City, United States
 Volgograd International Airport, Volgograd, Russia
 VOG-17, VOG-25, VOG-30 ammunition for Soviet and Russian-made grenade launchers
 "Voice of God", industry term for a public address announcer